Charles John Read (16 February 1958 – 14 August 2015) was a British mathematician known for his work in functional analysis. He won the 1985 Junior Berwick Prize for his work on the invariant subspace problem.

Read has also published on Banach algebras and hypercyclicity; in particular, he constructed the first example of an amenable, commutative, radical Banach algebra.

Education and career
Read won a scholarship to study mathematics at Trinity College, Cambridge in October 1975, and was awarded a first-class degree in Mathematics in 1978. He completed his PhD thesis entitled Some Problems in the Geometry of Banach Spaces at the University of Cambridge under the supervision of Béla Bollobás. He spent the year 1981–82 at Louisiana State University.At the time of his death, he was a Professor of Pure Mathematics at the University of Leeds after having been a fellow of Trinity for several years.

Personal life

Christianity
On his personal website, formerly at the University of Leeds, Read described himself first and foremost as a Born-Again Christian.  Some biographical details may be found in what he described as his Christian Testimony  on that site describing his conversion process.

He described losing his father to cancer in 1970 when he was 11 years old, and that this loss prompted him to ask questions about whether, and in what form, we might continue to live after we die - and that consciousness may be independent of the body. He came to the conclusion that the conscious mind must survive after death. This also led him to believe that since we are "immortal beings" that we must always try to "do the right thing".

Some time later the article described an incident where he had pushed a smaller boy out of the way in a queue at a sweet shop. He later interpreted his later sense of remorse at having done something wrong as the "Classical Christian conviction of sin", and claimed to have had a religious experience on a London Underground train where he felt a sense of joy at being forgiven, and simultaneously bursting into tears.

Read also claimed to have taken part in a miracle of Christian healing at a Christian meeting run by John Wimber, organiser of the Vineyard Movement.

Controversy over Read's Christian Testimony 
An article in The Gryphon, the Leeds University Student Union newspaper in February 2015 stated that Read had "sparked controversy" by stating that at the end of his testimony: "‘I strongly urge you to seek the truth as a researcher, not trusting anyone else to do your basic investigations for you. That’s right, Jesus is the Way. But you have to find that out for yourself. For those who seek find, but those who can’t be bothered, or who think they’re too cool, end in a very dark place. It won't be cool in Hell.’"

The article was prompted by a third-year Maths student who had expressed the opinion to the paper that the university website should not be giving details of personal beliefs as they were nothing to do with the ability to learn maths.

Read subsequently displayed on his website a scanned image of the original article, under which a handwritten comment notes that "Leeds Gryphon, 13-2-15 notices Christian Testimony of CJR after several years!"

Cave diving 
Read was also a devotee of solo cave diving and wrote extensively about it on his website.
He remained single in his life; he is survived by his mother and sister.

Death
Read died in Winnipeg in August 2015 while on a research visit at the University of Manitoba.

References

External links
Charles Read's Homepage
Charles Read at the Mathematics Genealogy Project

Functional analysts
Operator theorists
1958 births
2015 deaths
British Christians
20th-century British mathematicians
21st-century British mathematicians
Mathematical analysts
Academics of the University of Leeds
Alumni of the University of Cambridge